Nora Norrish is a former female international table tennis player from England.

Table tennis career
She represented England as part of the women's team for the 1934 Corbillon Cup (women's world team event) (held in December 1933). The team consisting of Dora Emdin, Margaret Osborne and Wendy Woodhead just outside of the medals and finished in fourth place.

She set a women's record of four Liverpool Championships from 1933 to 1936.

Personal life
She represented Bootle at club level.

See also
 List of England players at the World Team Table Tennis Championships

References 

English female table tennis players